Ravenna is a city in Fannin County, Texas, United States. The population was 209 at the 2010 census.

Geography

Ravenna is located in northwestern Fannin County at  (33.671759, –96.241773).

Demographics

As of the census of 2000, there were 215 people, 86 households, and 65 families residing in the city. The population density was 177.6 people per square mile (68.6/km2). There were 94 housing units at an average density of 77.6 per square mile (30.0/km2). The racial makeup of the city was 97.67% White, 0.93% from other races, and 1.40% from two or more races. Hispanic or Latino of any race were 1.40% of the population.

There were 86 households, out of which 32.6% had children under the age of 18 living with them, 65.1% were married couples living together, 5.8% had a female householder with no husband present, and 24.4% were non-families. 22.1% of all households were made up of individuals, and 15.1% had someone living alone who was 65 years of age or older. The average household size was 2.50 and the average family size was 2.91.

In the city, the population was spread out, with 27.0% under the age of 18, 6.0% from 18 to 24, 27.0% from 25 to 44, 23.3% from 45 to 64, and 16.7% who were 65 years of age or older. The median age was 38 years. For every 100 females, there were 100.9 males. For every 100 females age 18 and over, there were 96.3 males.

The median income for a household in the city was $31,875, and the median income for a family was $42,778. Males had a median income of $33,125 versus $17,500 for females. The per capita income for the city was $13,581. About 12.1% of families and 17.5% of the population were below the poverty line, including 28.8% of those under the age of eighteen and 17.1% of those 65 or over.

Education
Ravenna is served by the Bonham Independent School District.

Notable people
Mary Lightfoot, painter and printmaker, was born in Ravenna

References

Cities in Fannin County, Texas
Cities in Texas